was a railway station on the Sekihoku Main Line in Kitami, Hokkaido, Japan, operated by Hokkaido Railway Company (JR Hokkaido). Opened in 1914, the station closed in March 2016.

Lines
Kanehana Station was served by the Sekihoku Main Line, and was unstaffed. It was numbered "A54".

Layout

Adjacent stations

History
It was renamed Kanehana on 20 July 1951. The station was destaffed in 1983. With the privatization of Japanese National Railways (JNR) on 1 April 1987, the station came under the control of JR Hokkaido.

JR Hokkaido announced in July 2015 that it planned to close the station from the start of the revised timetable in March 2016, citing low passenger usage figures. The station closed following the last day of services on 25 March 2016.

Surrounding area
 National Route 242

See also
 List of railway stations in Japan

References

External links

 JR Hokkaido station information 

Railway stations in Hokkaido Prefecture
Stations of Hokkaido Railway Company
Railway stations in Japan opened in 1914
Railway stations closed in 2016
2016 disestablishments in Japan